The Building at 101 North Riverview Street is a historic commercial building located in Bellevue, Iowa, United States. It is one of over 217 limestone structures in Jackson County from the mid-19th century, of which 20 are commercial buildings. The two-floor structure was built around 1850 along the levee. Because the property slopes toward the Mississippi River, it appears to be a four-story building on the riverside. It was built to house a retail establishment, but its original use has not been determined. By 1885 it housed a dry goods store, and by 1894 it housed a hardware store and implement dealership, which was located here for decades. The rectangular plan structure is three bays wide, and it has a stone storefront. It was given a light coating of stucco and scored giving it an ashlar appearance. The second-floor windows have simple hoodmolds above them, while the rest of the windows have stone lintels. What differentiates this building from the others is that it is a freestanding commercial structure, capped with a hip roof. The building was listed on the National Register of Historic Places in 1991.

References

Commercial buildings completed in 1850
Vernacular architecture in Iowa
Commercial buildings on the National Register of Historic Places in Iowa
National Register of Historic Places in Jackson County, Iowa
Buildings and structures in Jackson County, Iowa
Bellevue